Mocis mutuaria is a species of moth of the family Erebidae. It is found in the Democratic Republic of Congo (Kinshasa, East Kasai, Bas Congo, North Kivu, Katanga), Kenya, Madagascar, Malawi, Mozambique, Namibia, Nigeria, Rwanda, South Africa, Tanzania, Uganda, Zambia and Zimbabwe.

References

Moths described in 1858
Mocis